Jim Danielsen (December 11, 1930 – ) is a retired NASCAR Winston Cup Series driver whose career spanned from 1972 to 1976.

He currently resides in Chico, CA

Career
He competed in 675 laps of NASCAR Cup Series racing action - the equivalent of  - and brought home a grand total of $6,975 in career earnings ($ when adjusted for inflation). He started in 32nd place on average and finished in 19th. Danielson's only "top ten" finish came at 1973 Winston Western 500. His attempts to qualify for the 1988 Budweiser 400 and the 1990 Banquet Frozen Foods 300 both led to DNQs. Danielson's primary sponsor was Chico's Auto Parts with the vehicle being the John Nissen and Skip Tarter-owned #9 Dodge.

Danielson also has raced in what is now known as the NASCAR K&N Pro Series West; where he competed in 54 racing events with 26 finishes in the "top ten." His K&N Pro Series career spanned from 1972 to 1991.

Jim Danielson also competed internationally during his career, finishing 9th in the Goodyear NASCAR 500 at the Calder Park Thunderdome in Melbourne, Australia, in February 1988 driving a Buick LeSabre. Although not a championship race, this was the first ever NASCAR race held outside of North America.

References

1930 births
NASCAR drivers
Sportspeople from Chico, California
Living people
Racing drivers from California